Sir David Robert Varney (born 11 May 1946) was the chairman of HM Revenue and Customs from its establishment in April 2005 to the end of August 2006. He was named as a recipient of a knighthood in the 2006 New Year's honours list. In the same year he was awarded an Honorary Degree, Doctor of Laws (LL. D.) from the University of Bath.

Private sector career
After graduating in Chemistry from the University of Surrey, where he was President of the Students' Union, Varney joined Shell in 1968. In 1990 he was appointed Head of Marketing, Branding and Product Development for Shell International Petroleum and in 1991 was appointed a Managing Director of Shell UK with responsibility for downstream activities. He was appointed a Director of Shell International Petroleum in 1996.

In June 1996 Varney joined BG (formerly British Gas), as Chief Executive designate of the proposed BG plc and was appointed Chief Executive the following year, overseeing the successful demerger of Lattice plc. He was Chairman of mobile phone operator mmO2 between 2001 and 2004. He was also Chairman of Business in the Community and is president of the Chartered Management Institute.

HM Revenue and Customs
HM Revenue and Customs was formed from the merger of the Inland Revenue and HM Customs & Excise in April 2005. Varney was appointed as the first executive chairman of the merged organisation having carried out that role in a shadow capacity from October 2004.

Varney's previous career as a private sector executive differs from the traditional career path of senior Civil Service heads.  On taking the role, Varney faced a number of key challenges including maintaining business-as-usual while delivering around 12,000 staff cuts under the Gershon Review and moving jobs out of the South-East of England under the Lyons Review.

Following the ending of his chairmanship of HM Revenue and Customs, he took up a role at HM Treasury as a permanent secretary. In December 2006, he delivered the report "Service Transformation: a better service for citizens and businesses, a better deal for the taxpayer", which aimed to improve the UK's service performance in interacting with citizens and businesses.

References

External links
 Accountancy Age profile
Lyons Review

Living people
1946 births
Alumni of the University of Surrey
Knights Bachelor
Chairmen of the Board of Inland Revenue
Chairmen of the Board of HM Customs and Excise
Chairmen of HM Revenue and Customs
British civil servants
Alumni of the Manchester Business School